Cacequi is a municipality in the state of Rio Grande do Sul, Brazil, 407 km from Porto Alegre. As of 2020 its population was estimated at 12,423. The town is situated at an elevation of 103 m, with an area of 2,441 km2, and is known as the capital of the watermelon.

History 

The town was emancipated on 23 December 1944. Its Patron Saint is Our Lady of Victory. Its name derives from the Tupi language: Cacequi, (bean's water) from cumandá, bean; í, water. Other definition say the name of the city means: indigenous chief water or indigenous chief River. The mayor of the city is Francisco Fonseca Franco.

References

External links
City Hall website

Municipalities in Rio Grande do Sul
1944 establishments in Brazil